Samuel Gottlieb Linde (polonised Samuel Bogumił Linde; 11 or 24 April 1771, in Toruń – 8 August 1847, in Warsaw) was a  linguist, librarian, and lexicographer of the Polish language. He was director of the Prussian-founded Warsaw Lyceum during its existence (1804–31), and an important figure of the Polish Enlightenment.

Life

Samuel Gottlieb Linde was born in Toruń, Crown of Poland, which 22 years later, after his birth, as a result of the Second Partition of Poland, became a city under the rule of the King of Prussia (Prussian Poland), to Jan Jacobsen Linde, a master locksmith and member of the city council who had immigrated from Sweden, and Anna Barbara, née Langenhann. His mother's family originated from Coburg. His second name Gottlieb has been rendered in Polish as Bogumił. Linde came from a German-speaking family but learned the Polish language in Leipzig in order to serve as a lector of Polish at University of Leipzig where he had previously studied theology and philology. In 1793 he began to collaborate with supporters of the Constitution of May 3, 1791. During the Kościuszko Uprising (1794) he was in Warsaw and supported Hugo Kołłątaj.

In 1795–1803 he was a librarian to Józef Maksymilian Ossoliński and began gathering material for his future dictionary for Polish and other Slavic grammar and expressions by traveling for six years through Galicia and to Moldova. He became director at the newly established Königlich-Preußisches Lyzäum in Warsaw, the later Warsaw Lyceum (1804-31).
Linde hired Frédéric Chopin's father, Nicolas Chopin, as a teacher of French language. The composer himself studied at the Lyceum in 1823–26.

Linde was a Lutheran and he was instrumental in establishing the Lutheran community in Warsaw. He is buried at the Evangelical Cemetery of the Augsburg Confession in Warsaw. Linde married Ludwika Nussbaum, originally from Switzerland. Their daughter Ludwika Emilia Izabela married Leopold Otto, a Lutheran pastor.

Works
It was the first major dictionary of the Polish language. The second edition was published posthumously in Lemberg (Polish Lwów, now Lviv) in 1854-1861. Both editions are now present in several digital libraries.

See also
 List of Poles

References

External links

1771 births
1847 deaths
Polish lexicographers
Linguists from Poland
Polish scientists
Polish Lutherans
Kościuszko insurgents
People from Toruń
Corresponding members of the Saint Petersburg Academy of Sciences
Recipients of the Order of Saint Stanislaus (Congress Poland)
Polish people of German descent
Polish people of Swedish descent